Kaundorf is a village in the commune of Lac de la Haute-Sûre, in north-western Luxembourg.  , the village has a population of 182.

See also
 List of villages in Luxembourg

Lac de la Haute-Sûre
Villages in Luxembourg